Bekirli is a köy (village) in Biga District of Çanakkale Province, Turkey. Its population is 231 (2021). Bekirli lies on the Kemer Road (Kemer Yolu), the north-south road between the village of Otlukdere and the coastal village of Kemer, and the bypass lies to the east of the village.

References

Villages in Biga District